Borhoi (Uyghur script: بورقاي يېزىسى, Борхои) is a township in Central Xinjiang Uyghur Autonomous Region of Northwest China,  west of Bosten Lake, the largest lake in Xinjiang. It is under the administration of Yanqi Hui Autonomous County in Bayin'gholin Mongol Autonomous Prefecture. According to the 2006 Chinese census, the township has a population of 5964 people, the majority being involved in agriculture.

References

External links
Hudong Encyclopedia 

Populated places in Xinjiang
Township-level divisions of Xinjiang
Yanqi Hui Autonomous County